Road to Perdition is a 2002 American crime drama film directed by Sam Mendes. The screenplay was adapted by David Self from the graphic novel of the same name written by Max Allan Collins and illustrated by Richard Piers Rayner. The film stars Tom Hanks, Paul Newman (in his final live-action theatrical film acting role), Jude Law, and Daniel Craig. The plot takes place in 1931, during the Great Depression, following a mob enforcer and his son as they seek vengeance against a mobster who murdered the rest of their family.

Filming took place in the Chicago area. Mendes, having recently finished 1999's acclaimed American Beauty, pursued a story that had minimal dialogue and conveyed emotion in the imagery. Cinematographer Conrad L. Hall took advantage of the environment to create symbolism for the film, for which he won several awards, including a posthumous Academy Award for Best Cinematography. The film explores several themes, including the consequence of violence and father-son relationships.

Road to Perdition was released on July 12, 2002, and eventually grossed over $181 million worldwide. The film was well received by critics, who mainly praised the direction and visuals, performances (particularly of Hanks,  Newman, and Law), cinematography, score, sound design, themes and setting. In addition to Hall's win for cinematography, the film earned five Academy Awards nominations, including Best Supporting Actor for Newman.

Plot
The film begins and ends in 1931 during the Great Depression with a voiceover from Michael Sullivan, Jr., speaking about his father. Michael Sullivan, Sr. was orphaned and then raised by Irish Mob boss John Rooney in Rock Island, Illinois; he is now Rooney's most fearsome enforcer, unbeknownst to his own children. Rooney has come to love Sullivan more than his own biological son, the rash and unpredictable Connor.

Speaking at his brother's wake, Rooney's associate Finn McGovern insinuates that Rooney is responsible for his brother's death. Rooney sends Connor and Sullivan to talk with McGovern, while 12-year-old Michael watches through a hole in the wall, after hiding in the back of the family car. McGovern steadfastly denies that his brother stole anything from the mob before implying Connor was responsible, and Connor shoots him on the spot before Sullivan shoots the other witnesses. Michael is detected and sworn to secrecy.

The next day, Rooney visits the house to intimidate the boy, and Michael soon begins misbehaving at school. At a meeting with his mob associates, Rooney pointedly humiliates Connor after he halfheartedly apologizes for McGovern's murder. Then he sends Sullivan to collect a debt from a speakeasy owner Tony Calvino. Connor, jealous and afraid, sends a letter with Sullivan for Calvino. Calvino reads it then reaches for his revolver, but Sullivan kills both Calvino and his bodyguard. The letter reads "Kill Sullivan and all debts are paid," and he rushes home. When he arrives he discovers Connor has already murdered his wife, Annie, and their younger son, Peter, but not Michael, who had arrived home late from detention.

Sullivan and Michael flee Rock Island and head to Chicago to meet Frank Nitti. He offers to work for the Chicago Outfit in exchange for permission to kill Connor, but Nitti rejects the offer. Rooney, listening next door with Connor, reluctantly allows Nitti to dispatch freelance killer Harlen Maguire, who doubles as a crime scene photographer, to kill Sullivan. Nitti suggests Michael must be killed as well to prevent him seeking revenge in the future, but Rooney refuses. However, Nitti secretly orders Maguire to kill Michael as well. Maguire tracks Sullivan to a roadside diner. The two meet and have a seemingly casual conversation while Michael hides in the car. Sensing the danger, Sullivan escapes the diner through the bathroom window and slashes Maguire's tires before driving away.

Sullivan now plots to force the Outfit to give up Connor by robbing the banks that hold its money. He teaches Michael to drive in order to become their getaway driver. Sullivan is impeded when the mob withdraws its money, so he visits Rooney's accountant Alexander Rance. Rance stalls Sullivan until Maguire enters with a shotgun, killing Rance while Sullivan escapes with Rooney's ledgers. However, during the escape, Maguire shoots Sullivan in the shoulder. Michael drives them to a farm after Sullivan collapses from his wound, where an elderly childless couple helps him recover. Sullivan's bond with his son grows and Michael comes to realize his father loves him.

The ledgers reveal that Connor has been embezzling from his father for years, using the names of dead men including McGovern. Believing Rooney will call off the hit on him if he knows the truth, Sullivan gifts the couple a chunk of the stolen cash and heads back to Chicago. Sullivan confronts Rooney at Mass, learning Rooney already knows about Connor and expects he will be killed – if not by Sullivan, then by Nitti's men once Rooney is dead. He still refuses to give up his son and urges Sullivan to flee with Michael and ensure he becomes a better man than either of them.

Later one night, cloaked by darkness and rain, Sullivan ambushes and kills Rooney's bodyguards with his Tommy Gun and walks up to Rooney. As Rooney mutters "I'm glad it's you", Sullivan reluctantly pulls the trigger. Having no further reasons to protect Connor now that Rooney is dead, Nitti reveals Connor's location after Sullivan promises the feud ends with his death. Sullivan goes to the hotel where Connor is hiding and kills him in the bathtub.

Sullivan takes his son to his Aunt Sarah's beach house in Perdition, on the shore of Lake Michigan, where he is ambushed and shot by Maguire inside the house as his son Michael Jr. stands on the beach. As Maguire photographs the dying Sullivan, Michael Jr. appears and points a gun at Maguire but cannot bring himself to pull the trigger. As Maguire beckons to Michael Jr. to give him the gun, Sullivan fatally shoots Maguire in his back, killing him. Michael Jr. tells his father that he couldn't pull the trigger, and Michael Sr. nods and smiles as he dies.

Michael says his father's fear was that he would follow the same road, and that he has not held a gun since his father died. Michael drives the car back to the farm, saying he grew up there, and now when he is asked if his father was a good man, he just tells them, "He was my father."

Cast

 Tom Hanks as Michael Sullivan
 Tyler Hoechlin as Michael Sullivan Jr.
 Paul Newman as John Rooney (based on John Patrick Looney)
 Jude Law as Harlen Maguire
 Daniel Craig as Connor Rooney
 Stanley Tucci as Frank Nitti
 Jennifer Jason Leigh as Annie Sullivan
 Liam Aiken as Peter Sullivan
 Dylan Baker as Alexander Rance
 Ciarán Hinds as Finn McGovern
 David Darlow as Jack Kelly
 Kerry Rossall as Rooney's Henchman (uncredited)
 Anthony LaPaglia as Al Capone (uncredited)
 Kevin Chamberlin as Frank the Bouncer
 Harry Groener as Mr. McDougal
 JoBe Cerny as Banker (as Jobe Cerny)

Production

Development
When Max Allan Collins wrote the graphic novel Road to Perdition, his book agent saw potential in the story as a film adaptation and showed it to a film agent. By 1999, the novel had reached Dean Zanuck, who was the vice president of development at the company owned by his father, producer Richard D. Zanuck. The novel was sent to the elder Zanuck in Morocco, who was there producing Rules of Engagement (2000). The Zanucks agreed on the story's prospect and sent it to director-producer Steven Spielberg. Shortly afterward, Spielberg set up the project at his studio DreamWorks, though he did not pursue direction of the film due to his full slate.

Mendes sought a new project after completing American Beauty (1999) and explored prospects including A Beautiful Mind, K-PAX, The Shipping News, and The Lookout. DreamWorks sent Mendes Road to Perdition as a prospect, and Mendes was attracted to the story, considering it "narratively very simple, but thematically very complex". He specified one theme being the parents' world is inaccessible to their children. Mendes considered the story's theme to be about how children deal with violence, and whether exposure to violence would render children violent themselves. Mendes described the script as having "no moral absolutes", a factor that appealed to the director.

Writing 
Spielberg first contacted screenwriter David Self to adapt the story into a feature film. Self wrote an initial draft that remained close to the source material and retained most of its dialogue. The screenplay was then rewritten by uncredited writers, distancing the script from the graphic novel and leaving the core elements of the story. Some of the harsher aspects of the story were toned down as the script became more streamlined; for example, in some early drafts of the screenplay, Sullivan became an alcoholic, but this element was ultimately absent from the final version.

The story itself is deeply informed by the Lone Wolf and Cub manga series. Novelist Max Allan Collins acknowledged the influence of Lone Wolf and Cub on his graphic novel Road to Perdition in an interview to the BBC, declaring that "Road To Perdition is 'an unabashed homage' to Lone Wolf and Cub".

Some of the characters' names were slightly changed from their original versions from the graphic novel: the surname of the real-life gangsters John Looney and his son Connor were changed to Rooney, and the surname of Tom Hanks' character and his family was streamlined from the original O'Sullivan to simply Sullivan. One significant addition to the script was the creation of Maguire to provide a persistent element of pursuit to the Sullivans' departure from the old world.

Hanks and cinematographer Conrad Hall requested Mendes to limit violence in the film to meaningful acts, rather than gratuitous carnage. Hanks' character, Michael Sullivan, is known as "The Angel of Death" in the graphic novel and invokes fear in those around him, but his infamy is downplayed in the film. Mendes, who described the graphic novel as "much more pulpy", sought to reduce the graphic novel's background to its essence, seeking the "nonverbal simplicity" of films like Once Upon a Time in America (1984), Pat Garrett and Billy the Kid (1973), and films by Akira Kurosawa that lack dialogue. Duplicate language in characters' confrontations in Road to Perdition was trimmed to the absolute minimum. Mendes described Road to Perdition as a "poetic, elegiac story, in which the pictures tell the story". An example of one such unspoken scene in the film was the piano duet between Rooney and Michael Sr., intended to convey their relationship without words. In the final 20 minutes of Road to Perdition, the script was written to have only six lines of dialogue.

Max Allan Collins originally wanted to write the adapted screenplay, but was not given the opportunity. He chose to stay out of the scripting process out of respect for the different style of writing for a different medium, though he served as a consultant in the process. Collins praised the addition of Maguire and considered the minimalist use of dialogue to be appropriate. The author also applauded the film's version of Rooney as "more overtly a father figure" to Sullivan.

Collins opposed the profanity in the script, as the vulgar language did not fit his vision of the 1930s. He also contested the path of Sullivan's son in the film. In the graphic novel, the son kills once, and in the film, he does not kill anyone. Collins also disagreed with the narration technique of the film. In the novel, the son narrates the story as an adult, becoming a priest, while in the film, he narrates while still a young boy.

Casting
Tom Hanks was sent a copy of the graphic novel by Steven Spielberg while he was filming Cast Away. Initially too busy to make sense of the story, he later received David Self's adapted screenplay, to which he became attached. Hanks, a father to four children, described Michael Sullivan's role, "I just got this guy. If you're a man, and you've got offspring ... emotionally, it's devastating."

Tyler Hoechlin was chosen from over 2,000 candidates to portray Michael Sullivan's son. The actor was 14 years old at the time of filming. For scenes in which Hoechlin's character assisted his father as a getaway driver, Hoechlin was trained by a driving instructor.

Paul Newman was unanimously the first choice for the role of John Rooney. The actor prepared by requesting Frank McCourt, the Irish-American author of Angela's Ashes, to record a tape of his voice.

David Self, who created the Maguire character, explained, "He gets so jaded from exposure to this world, he steps over the line from being the storyteller to being the story maker." To capture the "seedy countenance" of the character, Jude Law was given a sallow skin tone that reflected the wear from working in a darkroom. Law's teeth also received a lower gumline and had a rotted look. He was also given a weak, thinning hairline. Maguire's apartment also displays a collection of photographs of dead bodies, some of them actual police stills from the 1930s.

Stanley Tucci was selective about roles in gangster films, believing that Hollywood stereotyped Italian-Americans as gangsters. However, attracted by the prospect of working with Mendes, the actor accepted the role of Nitti, a real-life Mob boss from Chicago.

Anthony LaPaglia was cast as Al Capone and filmed a single scene, which was omitted from the final cut, and can be found in the DVD's deleted scenes. Mendes believed that Capone was more menacing as an unseen presence. Actor Alfred Molina was approached to portray Capone, but Molina was forced to turn the role down due to scheduling conflicts with Frida (2002).

Filming
Mendes sought to produce a period film that would avoid clichés in the gangster genre. He chose to film Road to Perdition on location in Chicago, IL including downtown at the University Club of Chicago, the Chicago neighborhood of Pullman, the Charles G. Dawes House in Evanston, Illinois, as well as the far west Chicago suburb of Geneva, Illinois. General Jones Armory, the state's largest location mainstay which houses units of the Illinois National Guard, was provided to the studio by the Illinois State Film Commission. Sets were built inside the armory, including interiors of the Sullivan family's home and the Rooney mansion. The availability of an inside location provided the crew complete control over the lighting environment, which was established with the rigging of scaffoldings.

Mendes collaborated with costume designer Albert Wolsky, production designer Dennis Gassner, and cinematographer Conrad Hall to design the film's style. Wolsky designed costumes that were "very controlled, with soft outlines and very soft silhouettes". Gassner built sets that could capture the cold look of the era. Mendes sought a muted palette for the film, having dark backgrounds and sets with dark, muted greens and grays. Mendes filmed Road to Perdition using the Super 35 format.

The director filmed exterior scenes in Illinois in the winter and the spring of 2001, using real weather conditions such as snow, rain, and mud for the scenes. Mendes considered the usage of bleak weather conditions and the intended coldness of Gassner's exterior locations to define the characters' emotional states. Pullman became a key location to reflect this theme, having several settings, including the town's historic Florence Hotel, easily redressed by the crew for the film. Filming concluded in June 2001.

Cinematography
 To establish the lighting of scenes in Road to Perdition, Mendes drew from the paintings of Edward Hopper as a source of inspiration, particularly Hopper's New York Movie (1939). Mendes and cinematographer Conrad Hall sought to convey similar atmospheric lighting for the film's scenes, applying a "less is more" mantra. Hall also shot at wide apertures that retained one point in the depth of field sharply focused. Hall considered the technique to provide an emotional dimension to the scenes. The cinematographer also used unconventional techniques and materials to create unique lighting effects. One of Hall's methods was to use black silk in daylight exterior scenes to filter the light enough to create an in-shade look.

Hall purposely distanced the camera from Hanks' character, Michael Sullivan Sr., at the beginning of the film to establish the perspective of Sullivan's son, who is unaware of his father's true nature. Hanks's character was filmed as partially obscured and seen through doorways, and his entrances and exits took place in shadows. A wide lens was used to maintain a distance from the character.

Shots in the film were drawn directly from panels in the graphic novel, illustrated by Richard Piers Rayner. An instance of the direct influence is the scene in which Michael Jr. looks up at the Chicago skyline from the vehicle, with the skyline reflected in the vehicle's glass.

A seamless 40-second driving scene, in which Michael Sullivan and his son travel into Chicago from the countryside, was aided by visual effects. The live-action part of the scene was filmed at LaSalle Street, and due to the lack of scenery for part of the drive down LaSalle Street, the background of Balbo Drive was included with the use of visual effects.

Music
See Road to Perdition (soundtrack)

Themes

Consequences of violence

The film's title, Road to Perdition, is both Michael Sullivan and his son's destination town and a euphemism for Hell, a road that Sullivan desires to prevent his son from traveling. Sullivan, who chooses his violent path early on in life, considers himself irredeemable and seeks to save his son from a similar fate. Said Mendes, "[Sullivan] is in a battle for the soul of his son. Can a man who has led a bad life achieve redemption through his child?" Hanks described Sullivan as a man who achieved a comfortable status through violent means, whose likely repercussions he ignored. Sullivan is a good father and husband, but also has a job that requires him to be a violent killer. The film explores this paradoxical dichotomy. When Sullivan is faced with the consequences, Hanks says, "At the moment we're dropped into the story, it is literally the last day of that false perspective." To keep Sullivan from justifying his violent actions in the film, Mendes omitted scenes in the final cut that had Sullivan explaining his background to his son.

In the film, most of the numerous acts of violence are committed off-screen. The violent acts were also designed to be quick, reflecting the actual speed of violence in the real world. The focus was not on the direct victims of the perpetuated violence, but the impact of violence on the perpetrators or witnesses to the act.

Fathers and sons
The film also explores father-son relationships between Michael Sullivan and his son, Sullivan and his boss, John Rooney, and between Rooney and his son Connor. Sullivan simultaneously idolizes and fears Rooney, and Sullivan's son feels the same about his own father. Rooney's son, Connor, has none of Sullivan's redeeming qualities, and Rooney is conflicted about whom to protect: his biological son or his surrogate son. Connor is jealous of his father's relationship with Sullivan, which fuels his actions, ultimately causing a domino effect that drives the film.

Because Sullivan shields his background from his son, his attempt to preserve the father-son relationship is actually harmful. Tragedy brings Sullivan and his son together. Sullivan escapes from the old world with his son, and the boy finds an opportunity to strengthen the relationship with his father. Tyler Hoechlin, who portrayed Michael Jr., explained, "His dad starts to realize that Michael is all he has now and how much he's been missing. I think the journey is of a father and son getting to know each other, and also finding out who they themselves are."

Water
Water served as a motif in the film. It was developed after researching the wake scene at the beginning of the film informed the director that corpses were kept on ice in the 1930s to keep bodies from decomposing. The notion was interwoven into the film, which linked the presence of water with death. Mendes reflected on the theme, "The linking of water with death ... speaks of the mutability of water and links it to the uncontrollability of fate. These are things that humans can't control."

Release
With filming concluding in June 2001, the studio intended a United States release for the following Christmas. However, in September 2001, Mendes requested more time. It was rescheduled for release on July 12, 2002, an unconventional move that placed the drama among the action-oriented summer films.

Reception

Box office
Road to Perdition opened in 1,798 theaters in its debut weekend, competing against several other new releases including Reign of Fire, Halloween: Resurrection and The Crocodile Hunter: Collision Course. It ended up grossing $22.1 million, placing second to holdover Men in Black II. It eventually grossed $104.5 million in the United States and $76.5 million in other territories for a worldwide total of $181 million.

Critical response 
Road to Perdition received positive reviews from critics, with Conrad L. Hall's cinematography, the production design, and the lead performances of Hanks and Newman being praised. Review aggregation website Rotten Tomatoes gives the film an approval rating of 81% based on 216 reviews, with an average rating of 7.5/10. The site's critical consensus reads, "Somber, stately, and beautifully mounted, Sam Mendes' Road to Perdition is a well-crafted mob movie that explores the ties between fathers and sons." Metacritic assigned the film a weighted average score of 72 out of 100, based on 36 critics, indicating "generally favorable reviews". Audiences polled by CinemaScore gave the film an average grade of "B+" on an A+ to F scale.

Roger Ebert of the Chicago Sun-Times praised Hall's cinematography and the thematic use of water. He, too, felt an emotional detachment from the characters, saying, "I knew I admired it, but I didn't know if I liked it ... It is cold and holds us outside."

Kirk Honeycutt of The Hollywood Reporter praised Hanks, Newman, and Craig but called Law's performance "almost cartoonish". Peter Travers of Rolling Stone also complimented Hanks and Newman: "[They] act together with the confidence of titans, their talents in the service of character, never star ego." Travers cited Hall's "breathtaking" cinematography and composer Thomas Newman's "evocative" score.

Paul Clinton of CNN said: "While these deeply human issues are touched upon, they're never fully explored, and that undermines the sense of greatness to which this movie obviously aspires". Clinton considered Craig's character "one-dimensional to the extreme". He found the cinematography too overpowering for the film's storyline, which he considered "weak". J. Hoberman of The Village Voice described the film as "grim yet soppy." He added: "The action is stilted and the tabloid energy embalmed." Stephen Hunter of The Washington Post thought that the script lost its path when Sullivan and his son fled their old life.

Eleanor Ringel Gillespie of The Atlanta Journal-Constitution enjoyed the film's cinematography and Depression-era setting, as well as the performances of Hanks and Newman. Gillespie expressed the wish that the film lasted a little longer to explore its emotional core further. Eric Harrison of the Houston Chronicle considered Road to Perdition "the most brilliant work in this [gangster] genre" since the uncut Once Upon a Time in America (1984). Harrison considered Self's script "so finely honed that the story can change directions in a heartbeat."

Accolades 

In April 2006, Empire recognized Road to Perdition as No. 6 on its list of the top 20 comic book films.

Home media
Max Allan Collins, who authored the graphic novel, was hired to write the novelization for the film adaptation. Collins initially turned in a draft that contained 90,000 words, but the licensing at DreamWorks required the author to use only the dialogue from the film and no additional dialogue. Collins reluctantly edited the novelization down to 50,000 words and later said he regretted taking on the task. In 2016, Brash Books published Collins' original version of the novelization as Road to Perdition: The New, Expanded Edition

Road to Perdition was released on DVD on February 25, 2003, in both full screen and anamorphic widescreen versions. The DVD's features included an audio commentary, deleted scenes, an HBO "Making of" documentary, and a photo gallery. Work on the DVD began on the same day the film's production began, and a collaborative effort among the director, the studio, and the DVD production crew shaped the DVD's content. Due to a limit of space on the DVD, the film's deleted scenes were chosen over a DTS soundtrack. Instead, the DVD included a Dolby Digital 5.1 soundtrack. A special edition DVD containing both DTS and Dolby Digital 5.1 soundtracks was also released, excluding the "Making of" documentary to fit both soundtracks.

Road to Perdition was released on Blu-ray Disc on August 3, 2010, featuring a widescreen transfer, a DTS-HD Master Audio 5.1 soundtrack, and all of the features from the DVD release.

References

Further reading

External links

 
 
 
 
 Cinematography coverage at American Cinematographer

2002 films
20th Century Fox films
BAFTA winners (films)
Cultural depictions of Frank Nitti
DreamWorks Pictures films
Films about father–son relationships
2000s English-language films
Films scored by Thomas Newman
Films about the Chicago Outfit
Films about the Irish Mob
Films directed by Sam Mendes
Films produced by Richard D. Zanuck
Films produced by Sam Mendes
Films set in Chicago
Films set in 1931
Films shot in Chicago
Films shot in Indiana
Films whose cinematographer won the Best Cinematography Academy Award
Live-action films based on DC Comics
The Zanuck Company films
American gang films
2000s American films